The 2000 Polish Film Awards was the 2nd edition of Polish Film Awards: Eagles.

Awards winners

Special awards

 Life Achievement Award: Andrzej Wajda

External links
 2000 Polish Film Awards at IMDb

Polish Film Awards ceremonies
Polish Film Awards
2000 in Poland